Randal Oto’o (born 23 May 1994) is a Gabonese football player who plays as a right back for C.D. Cova da Piedade.

References

External links 
 
 
 

1994 births
Living people
Gabonese footballers
Gabon international footballers
Sportspeople from Libreville
Association football defenders
S.C. Braga B players
Leixões S.C. players
C.D. Tondela players
K.V.C. Westerlo players
C.D. Cova da Piedade players
Primeira Liga players
Liga Portugal 2 players
Challenger Pro League players
2015 Africa Cup of Nations players
Expatriate footballers in Portugal
Expatriate footballers in Belgium
Gabonese expatriate sportspeople in Portugal
Gabonese expatriate sportspeople in Belgium
AS Stade Mandji players
21st-century Gabonese people